Dmitrijs Serjogins (born 23 February 1993) is a Latvian long-distance runner. In 2019, he competed in the men's marathon at the 2019 World Athletics Championships held in Doha, Qatar. He finished in 48th place.

Career 

In 2018, he competed in the men's half marathon at the 2018 IAAF World Half Marathon Championships held in Valencia, Spain. He finished in 101st place.

In 2019, he competed in the men's event at the 2019 European 10,000m Cup held in London, United Kingdom.

Competition record

References

External links 
 

Living people
1993 births
Place of birth missing (living people)
Latvian male long-distance runners
Latvian male marathon runners
World Athletics Championships athletes for Latvia